Gideon Singer (June 29, 1926 – May 11, 2015) was an Israeli actor and singer.

Biography
Born in Brno, Singer emigrated with his family from Czechoslovakia to Israel in 1940 and he was a survivor of the Patria shipwreck. Singer lived in Tel Aviv where he started singing as well as learning to play the violin and he also worked as a diamond polisher during his youth. After passing adolescence, Singer served in the Palmach where he also participated in the Chizbatron mainly during the late 1940s and early 1950s and he was also a member of a satire singing group along with Yaakov Ben-Sira, Shimon Bar and Reuven Shefer.

After appearing twice in the Israel Song Festival, Singer appeared frequently at the Habima Theatre, the Cameri Theatre and the Beersheba Theatre and appeared in stage adaptations of The Threepenny Opera, Twelfth Night and numerous musical productions. His success on-stage led him to star in European and Broadway theatre productions as well. On films, Singer had notable roles in One Pound Only, I Like Mike and Blaumilch Canal. His television appearances include Delet Haksamim and he was the Hebrew voice of Mr. Owl in Fabeltjeskrant.

In 1983, following his dismissal from the Habima Theatre, Singer moved to Austria and had lived in Vienna since 1987. He found professional opportunities on stage and screen and he heavily contributed to the Theater in der Josefstadt. He made his international cameo appearance in the 2015 film Woman in Gold. This was his final film before his death. Singer returned to Israel occasionally. His most notable visit was during his 80th birthday.

Personal life
Singer was married twice. From his first marriage, he had four children. His son, Joel is a lawyer who served as a legal adviser to the Israeli Foreign Minister during the Oslo Accords. He married Shira Singer ten years before his death.

Death
On May 11, 2015, at the age of 88, Singer died at Ichilov Hospital due to complications from heart surgery he had prior to leaving Austria. He was buried at Yarkon Cemetery.

Partial filmography

I Like Mike (1961) - Benjamin Arieli
Rak Ba'Lira (1963)
Sallah Shabati (1964)
Dalia And The Sailors (1964) - Vice Captain
Moishe Ventilator (1966)
Haminiyah Leretzach (1966)
Hu Halach B'Sadot (1967)
Ha-Shehuna Shelanu (1968)
Hamisha Yamim B'Sinai (1968) - Egyptian Colonel (uncredited)
Blaumilch Canal (1969) - Police Chief Akiva Levkowicz
Shod Hatelephonim Hagadol (1972)
Nahtche V'Hageneral (1972)
Ha-Glula (1972)
Azit Hakalba Hatzanhanit (1972) - Dr. Haruvi
HaSandlar HaAliz (1973)
Ha-Balash Ha'Amitz Shvartz (1973)
Abu el Banat (1973) - Dr. Mazor
Rak Hayom (1976) - Doctor Lapid
Another Shadow (1976)
Millioner Betzarot (1978) - Gila's Father
The Fox in the Chicken Coop (1978) - Prof. Tennebaum / Elifaz hermanovitch
Imi Hageneralit (1979)
Ta'ut Bamispar (1979) - Hotel Manager
Lo La'alot Yoter (1979) - Dr. Singer
Transit (1980)
Firefox (1982) - KGB agent (uncredited)
Trostgasse 7 - eine Kindheit in Wien 1934-1938 (1988) - Herr Kohn
Hund und Katz (1991) - Pogosz
Gospel According to Harry (1994) - Jerry
Ha-Gamal Hame'ofef (1994) - Professor Bauman
Jailbirds (1996) - Opa Steinbock
Der Bockerer 2 (1996) - Beamter im Paßamt
Der Bockerer III - Die Brücke von Andau (2000) - Pfalzners assistant
Woman in Gold (2015) - Restitution witness

References

External links

1926 births
2015 deaths
Actors from Brno
Musicians from Brno
Male actors from Tel Aviv
Musicians from Tel Aviv
Czechoslovak emigrants to Mandatory Palestine
Israeli people of Czech-Jewish descent
Jewish Israeli male actors
Jewish Israeli musicians
Shipwreck survivors
Palmach members
Chizbatron members
Israeli male film actors
Israeli male television actors
Israeli male stage actors
Israeli male musical theatre actors
20th-century Israeli male singers
Israeli expatriates in Austria
20th-century Israeli male actors
Deaths from complications of heart surgery
Burials at Yarkon Cemetery
Moravian Jews
20th-century Israeli Jews
21st-century Israeli Jews